Criminal: UK (or Criminal: United Kingdom) is a British police procedural anthology series created by George Kay and Jim Field Smith, starring Katherine Kelly, Lee Ingleby, Mark Stanley, Rochenda Sandall and Shubham Saraf as the highly-trained members of a special interrogative division of the Metropolitan Police. Netflix released the first series of three episodes on 20 September 2019 and a second series of four episodes on 16 September 2020.

It is part of Netflix's anthology series Criminal. The first series consisted of three episodes, the same as three other series with unrelated stories set in three countries and filmed in local languages: Criminal: France, Criminal: Spain, and Criminal: Germany.

The second series, which consisted of four episodes, received two nominations at the 2021 British Academy Television Awards: Best Supporting Actor for Kunal Nayyar and Best Supporting Actress for Sophie Okonedo.

Premise
The show is set within the confines of a police interrogation room (and its viewing quarters) where a specialised interrogative unit of the Metropolitan Police engage in intense games of psychological cat-and-mouse with their suspects to find the answers that they need to close the case.

Cast

Main cast
 Katherine Kelly – Detective Chief Inspector Natalie Hobbs, the head of the special interrogative unit.
 Lee Ingleby – Detective Inspector Tony Myerscough, Natalie's second-in-command and often the voice of reason, who nurses a secret crush on Natalie.
 Mark Stanley – Detective Constable Hugo Duffy, a talented but inexperienced interrogator with a hidden alcohol addiction.
 Rochenda Sandall – Detective Constable Vanessa Warren, an unambitious member of the team who prefers supporting background roles, as opposed to leading interviews.
 Shubham Saraf – Detective Constable Kyle Petit, the junior-most member of the unit, ostensibly hired for a secret training programme.
 Nicholas Pinnock – Detective Inspector Paul Ottager (series 1), a former member of the unit (and brief sexual partner of Natalie) who has now returned with a new rank.
 Aymen Hamdouchi – Detective Sergeant Jamie Reiss (series 2), a new member of the unit, hired to replace Paul after his offscreen departure at the end of series 1.

Guest cast
 David Tennant – Edgar Fallon, a doctor, accused of rape and murder (episode: "Edgar")
 Kit Harington – Alex, a real estate sales manager, accused of rape (episode: "Alex")
 Hayley Atwell – Stacey Doyle, an aggressive petty criminal, accused of murder (episode: "Stacey")
 Kunal Nayyar – Sandeep Singh, a convicted killer, accused of an additional murder (episode: "Sandeep")
 Sophie Okonedo – Julia Bryce, the long-suffering wife of a convicted murderer (episode: "Julia")
 Sharon Horgan – Danielle Dunne, the head of a vigilante group targeting online pedophiles (episode: "Danielle")
 Youssef Kerkour – Jamal "Jay" Muthassin, a truck driver accused of aiding human smuggling (episode: "Jay")
 Lolita Chakrabarti – Anita Baines, Edgar's solicitor (episode: "Edgar")
 Mark Quartley – Jeremy Nicholson, Stacey's solicitor (episode: "Stacey")
 Kevin Eldon – Michael Walker, Jay's solicitor (episode: "Jay")
 Rakhee Thakrar – Nasreen Shah, Julia's solicitor (episode: "Julia")
 Amanda Drew – Alex's solicitor (episode: "Alex")
 Jyuddah Jaymes – Henry Regis, Danielle's solicitor (episode: "Danielle")
 Annette Badland – Donna Swift, a senior prosecutor (episode: "Sandeep")
 Clare-Hope Ashitey – Sergeant Adele Addo, head of a search-and-rescue squad of the Metropolitan Police (episode: "Jay")
 Isabella Laughland – McRae, a member of Adele's team (episode: "Jay")

Production
The first series was filmed at Netflix's production hub at Secuoya Studios,  in Madrid. The same location was also used for Criminal: France, Criminal: Spain and Criminal: Germany. The second series was filmed at Shepperton Studios, London.

David Tennant, Hayley Atwell and Youssef Kerkour were featured as the Accused in series 1. In September 2020, Sophie Okonedo, Kit Harington, Sharon Horgan and Kunal Nayyar were announced as guest stars for the second series.

Episodes

Series 1 (2019)

Series 2 (2020)

Release
Criminal: UK was released on 20 September 2019 on Netflix streaming. The second series was released on 16 September 2020.

Reception
For series 1, review aggregator Rotten Tomatoes compiled 39 reviews, identified 85% of them as positive, and found an average rating of 7.32/10. The website's critics consensus states, "Though a bit uneven, Criminals claustrophobic stylings and constantly twisting narratives pair nicely with its visual experiments, creating a crime drama that's equal parts creepy and captivating".

References

External links
 
 

2019 British television series debuts
2010s British drama television series
2020s British drama television series
2010s British police procedural television series
2020s British police procedural television series
2010s British anthology television series
2020s British anthology television series
English-language Netflix original programming
Television shows set in the United Kingdom
Television shows filmed in Spain